Moretele is a local municipality in Bojanala Platinum District Municipality, North West Province, South Africa. Population: 180,000.

Main places
The 2001 census divided the municipality into the following main places:

Ruigtesloot

Politics 

The municipal council consists of fifty-two members elected by mixed-member proportional representation. Twenty-six councillors are elected by first-past-the-post voting in twenty-six wards, while the remaining twenty-six are chosen from party lists so that the total number of party representatives is proportional to the number of votes received. In the election of 1 November 2021 the African National Congress (ANC) won a majority of thirty-five seats on the council.

The following table shows the results of the election.

References

External links
 Official website

Local municipalities of the Bojanala Platinum District Municipality